Below are the rosters for teams competing in the 2006 World Junior Ice Hockey Championships.

Group A

Head coach:  Brent Sutter

Head coach:  Walt Kyle

Head coach:  Hannu Aravirta

Head coach:  Jakob Kölliker

Head coach:  Petter Thoresen

Group B

Head coach:  Sergei Mikhalev

Head coach:  Torgny Bendelin

Head coach:  Radim Rulík

Head coach:  Branislav Šajban

Head coach:  Olegs Znaroks

External links
International Ice Hockey Federation

Rosters
World Junior Ice Hockey Championships rosters